Kūjėnai (formerly) is a village in Kėdainiai district municipality, in Kaunas County, in central Lithuania. According to the 2011 census, the village had a population of 17 people.

History 
Kūjėnai has been mentioned the first time by Hermann von Wartberge in 1372, when the village was raided by the Teutonic Order.

Kūjėnai was a folwark of the Zabielos family, and of the Černiauskai family later in the 19th century.

Demography

References

Villages in Kaunas County
Kėdainiai District Municipality